Unplugged may refer to:

Acoustic music, music not produced through electronic means
"Unplugged" (B.A.P song), 2014
"Unplugged" (Modern Family), a 2010 episode of Modern Family

Albums and EPs
Unplugged (5'nizza album), 2002
Unplugged (5 Seconds of Summer EP), 2012
Unplugged (7th Heaven album), 2009
Unplugged (Alice in Chains album), 1996
Unplugged (Alicia Keys album), 2005
Unplugged (Anal Cunt album), 1991
Unplugged (Arrested Development album), 1992
Unplugged (Aventura album), 2004
Unplugged (The Corrs album) (The Corrs), 1999
Unplugged (Eric Clapton album), 1992
Unplugged (Die Fantastischen Vier album)
Unplugged (Godhead EP), a 2007
Unplugged (Hurd album), 1999
Unplugged (Kerber album), 1999
Unplugged (The Korgis album), 2006
Unplugged (Leessang album), 2012
Unplugged (Mizraab album), 2012
Unplugged (Neil Young album), 1993
Unplugged (Siti Nurhaliza album), 2015
Unplugged (Tempo album), 2001
Unplugged (Unspoken album), 2015
Unplugged (The Official Bootleg), a 1991 album by Paul McCartney
Unplugged, a Mnemonic EP
Unplugged: Live from Sugarhill Studios, a 2013 EP by Lynch Mob
MTV Unplugged, a TV and album series showcasing popular musical artists playing acoustic instruments
MTV Unplugged (10,000 Maniacs album), 1993
MTV Unplugged in New York (Nirvana album), 1994
MTV Unplugged (Bryan Adams album), 1997
MTV Unplugged (Katy Perry EP), 2009
MTV Unplugged (Mariah Carey EP), 1992
MTV Unplugged (Shakira album), 2000
MTV Unplugged (Shawn Mendes album), 2017

See also